Feige 55 is a hot white dwarf approximately 650 light-years away from the Sun in the constellation of Ursa Major. The star is likely a post-AGB star with relatively high luminosity for a standard white dwarf. It is also in a close binary system with orbital period of 1.4933 days.

References

Ursa Major (constellation)
White dwarfs
Binary stars
M-type main-sequence stars